Lee Ashcroft may refer to:

Lee Ashcroft (English footballer) (born 1972), English football manager and former forward
Lee Ashcroft (Scottish footballer) (born 1993), Scottish football defender